Jianyang (Kienyang) (Northern Min:  / ) is a dialect of Northern Min Chinese spoken in Jianyang in the north of Fujian province.

Phonology
Jianyang dialect has 18 initials, 34 rimes and 8 tones.

Initials

 Fricative and affricate sounds /, / are realized as more palatal as [, ], when preceding front vowels.
 // can be realized as an approximant [] within different segments.

Rimes

Tones

It's quite different from many other Chinese dialects.

References

Chen, Matthew (2000). Tone Sandhi: Patterns across Chinese Dialects. CUP.
Norman, Jerry (1969). "The Kienyang Dialect of Fukien". Ph.D. dissertation, University of California, Berkeley.

Northern Min